Ian Frazer (born 1953) is a Scottish-born Australian immunologist.

Ian Frazer may also refer to:
Ian Frazer (poker player), English poker player and commentator
Ian Frazer (cricketer) (born 1966), cricketer

See also
Ian Frazier (disambiguation)
Ian Fraser (disambiguation)
Iain Fraser (disambiguation)